Edith Heerdegen (2 July 1913 – 13 July 1982) was a German actress. She appeared in more than 50 films and television shows between 1949 and 1982.

Filmography

References

External links

1913 births
1982 deaths
German film actresses
German stage actresses
20th-century German actresses
Actors from Dresden